is a passenger railway station located in the city of Honjō, Saitama, Japan, operated by East Japan Railway Company (JR East).

Lines

Station layout
The station consists of two side platforms serving two tracks, which form a passing loop on the single-track line. The platforms are connected to the station building by a footbridge. The station is Unstaffed from march 2021.

Platforms

History
The station opened on 1 July 1931. A new station building was completed in December 2015..

Passenger statistics
In fiscal 2019, the station was used by an average of 356 passengers daily (boarding passengers only).

Surrounding area
 Saitama Prefectural Kodama High School
 Kodama Post Office
 Former Kodama Town Hall

See also
 List of railway stations in Japan

References

External links

 JR East station information 

Stations of East Japan Railway Company
Railway stations in Saitama Prefecture
Hachikō Line
Railway stations in Japan opened in 1931
Honjō, Saitama